Flora is a Roman goddess of flowers and of the season of spring – a symbol for nature and flowers (especially the may-flower). While she was otherwise a relatively minor figure in Roman mythology, being one among several fertility goddesses, her association with the spring gave her particular importance at the coming of springtime, as did her role as goddess of youth.  She was one of the fifteen deities who had their own flamen, the Floralis, one of the flamines minores.  Her Greek counterpart is Chloris.

Etymology 

The name Flōra descends from Proto-Italic *flōsā ('goddess of flowers'), itself a derivation from Proto-Italic *flōs ('flower'; cf. Latin flōs, flōris 'blossom, flower'). It is cognate with the Oscan goddess of flowers Fluusa, demonstrating that the cult was known more widely among Italic peoples. The name ultimately derives from Proto-Indo-European *bʰleh₃ōs ('blossoming').

Festival
Her festival, the Floralia, was held between April 28 and May 3 and symbolized the renewal of the cycle of life, drinking, and flowers. The festival was first instituted in 240 B.C.E, and on the advice of the Sibylline books, she was also given a temple in 238 B.C.E.  At the festival, with the men decked in flowers, and the women wearing normally forbidden gay costumes, five days of farces and mimes were enacted – ithyphallic, and including nudity when called for – followed by a sixth day of the hunting of goats and hares. On May 23 another (rose) festival was held in her honor.

Flora's Greek equivalent is Chloris, who was a nymph. Flora is married to Favonius, the wind god also known as Zephyr, and her companion was Hercules.

Flora achieved more prominence in the neo-pagan revival of Antiquity among Renaissance humanists than she had ever enjoyed in ancient Rome.

Music
Flora is the main character of the ballet The Awakening of Flora. She is also mentioned in Henry Purcell's Nymphs and Shepherds.

Sculpture
There are many monuments to Flora, for example in Rome  (Italy), Valencia (Spain), and  Szczecin (Poland).

In art

See also
Abundantia
Feronia
Flora Fountain
Fauna
Nymph
Pomona
8 Flora

References

Bibliography

Primary 

 Ovid, Fasti V.193-212
 Macrobius, Saturnalia I.10.11-14
 Lactantius, Divinae institutions I.20.6-10

External links

 
 
 
 The Obscure Goddess Online Directory: Flora

Roman goddesses
Fertility goddesses
Spring deities
Nature goddesses
Italic deities